"Somebody" is the B-side to Aerosmith's first single, "Dream On", from their 1973 debut album, Aerosmith. Written by lead singer Steven Tyler and his friend Steven Emspak and released in June 1973, its A-side peaked at number 59 nationally but hit big in the band's native Boston, where it was the number 1 single of the year on the less commercial top 40 station, WBZ-FM, number 5 for the year on highly rated Top 40 WRKO-AM, and number 16 on heritage Top 40 WMEX-AM.

"Somebody" is driven by a basic blues guitar riff and Tyler's lyrics tell the story of a character trying to search for the woman of his dreams. The character is in need of someone who shares the work with him and has been through the same difficulties in their life as he has. Originally written in 1970.

Single track listings

7" 45 RPM
Side one
"Dream On"
Side two
"Somebody"

Live performances 
Aerosmith regularly performed this song throughout the early seventies, the first known time was in Mendon, Massachusetts on November 6, 1970 at Nipmuc Regional High School. The last-known performance of the song was in Yokohama on June 26, 1988 at the Yokohama Cultural Gymnasium during the Permanent Vacation Tour.

References 

1973 debut singles
Aerosmith songs
1973 songs
Songs written by Steven Tyler
Song recordings produced by Adrian Barber